Chemical arms control is the attempt to limit the use or possession of chemical weapons through arms control agreements. These agreements are often motivated by the common belief "that these weapons ...are abominable", and by a general agreement that chemical weapons do "not accord with the feelings and principles of civilized warfare."

The first chemical arms control agreement was the Strasbourg Agreement of 1675 between France and the Holy Roman Empire. This bilateral pact prohibited the use of poisoned bullets in any war between the two states. In the several centuries after that agreement, as chemistry advanced, states developed more sophisticated chemical weapons, and the primary concern in arms control shifted from poison bullets to poison gases.  Thus, in the Hague Convention of 1899, a large group of states agreed "to abstain from the use of projectiles the sole objective of which is the diffusion of asphyxiating or deleterious gases". The 1907 Hague Convention and other early attempts at chemical arms control were also significant in restricting the use of chemical weapons in warfare.

World War I broke out in Europe less than 20 years after the signing of the Hague Conventions. During that conflict, chemical weapons were used extensively by all sides in what still remains the largest case of chemical warfare. The use of chemical weapons in warfare was a war crime as such use was in direct violation of the 1899 Hague Declaration Concerning Asphyxiating Gases and the 1907 Hague Convention on Land Warfare, which prohibited the use of "poison or poisoned weapons" in warfare. After World War I, arms control agreements in general, and chemical arms control agreements in particular, gained renewed support. After seeing the gas attacks of the war, the general public overwhelmingly supported provisions that strongly regulated chemical weapons. In one survey of Americans, 367,000 favored banning chemical warfare while 19 supported its continuation in the future. This public opinion stimulated increased efforts for a ban on chemical weapons. These efforts led to several agreements in the years before World War II, including the Geneva Protocol.

World War II was seen as a significant success for chemical arms control as none of the belligerents made significant use of chemical weapons.  In the immediate aftermath of the war, arms control efforts focused primarily on nuclear weapons given their immense destructive power, and chemical disarmament was not a priority. Nonetheless, chemical warfare began to expand again with gas attacks during the Yemeni Civil War, and allegations of use during the Korean War. Along with the substantial use of chemical weapons in the Iran–Iraq War, these incidents led to a renewed interest in chemical disarmament and increased the push towards disarmament, finally culminating in the 1993 Chemical Weapons Convention, a full-scale ban on the use, production and stockpiling of weapons, which took force in 1997.

List of agreements

See also

 List of weapons of mass destruction treaties
 Biological Weapons Convention (1975)

Notes

References
General references

Specific references

Chemical
Arms control
Agreements
Lists of treaties